The Alba Bouwer Prize is a prize for outstanding children's literature in Afrikaans, awarded triennially by the South African Academy of Science and Arts. Works qualifying for the prize should have been published within the preceding three years, and be intended for under-12s.

Recipients
Recipients of the Alba Bouwer Prize are:
1989 Freda Linde,  (1987)
1992 Joint winners:
 Barrie Hough,  (1990)
 Marietjie de Jongh,  (1991)
1995 Corlia Fourie,  (1994) and Die wit vlinder (1993)
1998 Philip de Vos,  (1995)
2001 Martie Preller,  (2000)
2004 Leon de Villiers,  (2003)
2007 Jaco Jacobs,  (2005)
2010 Linda Rode,   (2009)
2013 Elizabeth Wasserman,  (2012)
2016 Kobus Geldenhuys,  (a translation of Why the Whales Came by Michael Morpurgo)
2019 Jaco Jacobs,  (2016)

References

External links

South African Academy of Science and Arts (in Afrikaans)

Children's literary awards
South African literary awards
Awards established in 1989
South African literary events